The Thames Archway Company was a company formed in 1805 to build the first tunnel under the Thames river in London.

The development of dockyards on both sides of the river around the Isle of Dogs indicated that a river crossing of some kind was needed.  A tunnel from Rotherhithe to Limehouse was suggested in about 1803 in which the Nothumbrian engineer Robert Vazie became involved.  An Act of Parliament was obtained on 12 July 1805 which enabled the Thames Archway Company to start construction.

The idea was to bore a pilot tunnel or 'driftway' starting from a shaft to be sunk in Rotherhithe (i.e. from the south bank). The driftway was supposed to drain the surrounding bedrock and then be enlarged into a full, brick-arched tunnel which would accommodate two-way vehicular traffic. Unfortunately the firm strata anticipated were mostly sand and gravel with pockets of quicksand.

In 1807 the directors of the company brought in Richard Trevithick who agreed to take the driftway across the river for a success fee of £1,000.  Employing Cornish miners to dig and a 30-horsepower steam engine to pump, he eventually succeeded in making the driftway  from the Rotherhithe shaft: he had tunnelled under the Thames, albeit only beyond the low-water mark.  This was the first time that anyone had made a tunnel pass underneath the actual water of any river.  However, it remained to complete the excavation under the high-water mark, and this Trevithick was unable to do, owing to breakthroughs of quicksand.

The failure of the Thames Archway project led engineers to conclude that "an underground tunnel is impracticable".

About 40 years later Marc Isambard Brunel and Isambard Kingdom Brunel built the Thames Tunnel about half a mile upstream.

Notes

References
Aaseng, Nathan; Construction: Building the Impossible, The Oliver Press Inc., 1999
Smith, Denis; London and the Thames Valley, Thomas Telford, 2001

Tunnels underneath the River Thames
Companies established in 1805
1805 establishments in England
British companies established in 1805